Shaikh Asiri Lahiji (Persian:) (birth:1506) (full-name: Shamsuddin Muhammad bin Yahya Bin Ali Lahiji Nurbakshi) was a well-known Persian poet, theologian, and Sufi mystic of Noorbakshi Order. He got the traditions of mysticism from Shah Syed Muhammad Nurbakhsh Qahistani and was among Syed Muhammad Nurbaksh's favourite disciples. He joined the service of Syed Muhammad Nurbaksh in A.H 849/A.D 1445 and remained in the service for 16 years. During his service, he thrice obtained the consent of Shah Syed to become a guide to those who came to him to seek guidance.

After the death of Syed Muhammad Nurbaksh, Lahiji took up his abode in Shiraz where he began guiding Nurbakshi followers in the province of Herat. He built a hospice in Shiraz named "Khanqah i Nooriyeh". Lahiji died in Shiraz and was buried in the same hospice. He was the most learned disciple of Mir Sayyid Mihammad Nurbakhsh Qahistani and a great scholar of Sufia Noorbakhshia school of Islam.

Works 
He wrote more than 500 ghazals and numerous quatrains under the pen-name Asiri, and was also an outstanding philosopher who wrote an interpretation and a philosophical commentary on Shabistari's Gulshan-i Raz known as Mafatih ul Ejaz Fi Sharah Gulshan-e-Raaz.

His most important works are:-

 Mafatih ul Ejaz Fi Sharah Gulshan-e-Raaz
 Masnavi Asrar o Shuhud
 Divan-e-Assiri

See also 
 Seyyed Qutb al-Din Mohammad Neyrizi

External links 
 The Secret Garden

References 

16th-century Persian-language poets
1506 births
Iranian Sufi saints
Year of death missing
16th-century Iranian writers
People from Lahijan